Pandiyan (5 January 1959 – 10 January 2008) was an Indian actor and politician who acted in lead roles in about 75 Tamil films from 1983 to 1992 and supporting roles from 1993 to 2001.

Career
Pandiyan was selling bangles in his family owned jewellery shop in Madurai, India when he was spotted by director Bharathiraja who offered him the lead role in the film Mann Vasanai (1983) which became a box-office hit. Following the success, Pandiyan was cast in over 75 films. Pandiyan joined the All India Anna Dravida Munnetra Kazhagam (AIADMK) in 2001.

Death
Pandiyan died of liver failure due to viral hepatitis on 10 January 2008.

Filmography

Notes

References

External links
 

1959 births
2008 deaths
Male actors from Madurai
Male actors in Tamil cinema
Indian male film actors
20th-century Indian male actors
21st-century Indian male actors
Politicians from Madurai
All India Anna Dravida Munnetra Kazhagam politicians
21st-century Indian politicians
Indian actor-politicians
Tamil Nadu politicians